NIAB EMR is a horticultural and agricultural research institute at East Malling, Kent in England, with a specialism in fruit  and clonally propagated crop production.  In 2016, the institute became part of the NIAB Group.

History

A research station was established on the East Malling site in 1913 on the impetus of local fruit growers. The original buildings are still in use today. Some of the finest and most important research on perennial crops has been conducted on the site, resulting in East Malling’s worldwide reputation. Some of the more well-known developments have been achieved in the areas of plant raising, fruit plant culture (especially the development of rootstocks), fruit breeding, ornamental breeding, fruit storage and the biology and control of pests and diseases.

From 1990 a division of Horticulture Research International (HRI) was on the site. HRI closed in 2009.

In 2016, East Malling Research became part of the National Institute of Agricultural Botany (NIAB) group.

Apple rootstocks
In 1912, Ronald Hatton initiated the work of classification, testing and standardisation of apple tree rootstocks. With the help of Dr Wellington, Hatton sorted out the incorrect naming and mixtures then widespread in apple rootstocks distributed throughout Europe. These verified and distinct apple rootstocks are called the "Malling series". The most widespread used was the M9 rootstock.

Structure
It is situated east of East Malling, and north of the Maidstone East Line. The western half of the site is in East Malling and Larkfield and the eastern half is in Ditton. It is just south of the A20, and between junctions 4 and 5 of the M20 motorway.

Function
Today the Research Centre also acts as a business enterprise centre supported by leading local businesses including QTS Analytical and Network Computing Limited. The conference centre trades as East Malling Ltd, being incorporated on 17 February 2004.

References

External links

Horticultural organisations based in the United Kingdom
Research institutes in Kent
Agricultural research institutes in the United Kingdom
Genetics or genomics research institutions
Botanical research institutes
Apples
Buildings and structures in Kent
Organizations established in 1913
1913 establishments in England
Horticultural companies of the United Kingdom
Tonbridge and Malling